Ostallgäu is a Landkreis (district) in Swabia, Bavaria, Germany. It is bounded by (from the west and clockwise) the districts of Oberallgäu, Unterallgäu, Augsburg, Landsberg, Weilheim-Schongau and Garmisch-Partenkirchen, and by the Austrian state of Tyrol. The town of Kaufbeuren is enclosed by but does not belong to the district.

History
Before 1803 the region was split into several tiny states, most of them clerical states. When these states were dissolved in 1803, the Ostallgäu region became part of Bavaria. The kings of Bavaria soon developed a special relationship with the region and built their famous castles of Hohenschwangau and Neuschwanstein there.

The district was established in 1972 by merging the former districts of Kaufbeuren, Marktoberdorf and Füssen.

Geography

"Ostallgäu" literally means "Eastern Allgäu". The term Allgäu is applied to the part of the Alps located in Swabia and their northern foothills.

The district extends from the crest of the Alps to hilly countryside in the north. It is located on either side of the Wertach, an affluent of the Lech. In the south there is a great number of alpine lakes, the largest of them being the Forggensee.

Coat of arms
The coat of arms displays:
 the heraldic lion of the medieval county of Ronsberg
 the sword of Saint Martin, the patron saint of Marktoberdorf
 an abbot's staff representing the Füssen monastery

Towns and municipalities

References

External links

 Official website (German)
 The online reference book about the Ostallgäu (German)
 Orchids in Allgäu

 
Districts of Bavaria